The Aboriginal Languages Act 2017 is a New South Wales statute that is the first law in Australia to recognise the importance of the languages of the first nations people and the history of government decisions to suppress Aboriginal languages in New South Wales. The Act recognises that Aboriginal languages are part of the cultural heritage of New South Wales and Aboriginal people are the custodians of these languages and have the right to control and nurture them. The Act establishes a statutory body to be known as the Aboriginal Languages Trust.

History
Prior to colonisation and settlement there were many languages spoken by the Aboriginal people living in what is now known as New South Wales. The first comprehensive investigation of Australian languages was conducted by William Dawes  from 1788 - 1791.

In November 2016, the New South Wales Government announced that it would be pursuing legislation aimed at protecting Aboriginal languages. The Aboriginal Languages Bill 2017 was introduced into the NSW Legislative Council on 11 October 2017 with a traditional message stick ceremony.

The NSW Aboriginal Languages Act 2017 became law on 24 October 2017. This is the first law in Australia to protect traditional Aboriginal languages. The Act recognises that "(a)  The languages of the first peoples of the land comprising New South Wales are an integral part of the world’s oldest living culture and connect Aboriginal people to each other and to their land.

(b)  As a result of past Government decisions Aboriginal languages were almost lost, but they were spoken in secret and passed on through Aboriginal families and communities.

(c)  Aboriginal people will be reconnected with their culture and heritage by the reawakening, growing and nurturing of Aboriginal languages.

(d)  Aboriginal languages are part of the cultural heritage of New South Wales.

(e)  It is acknowledged that Aboriginal people are the custodians of Aboriginal languages and have the right to control their growth and nurturing."

Aboriginal Languages Trust
The Act states that the objective of the Aboriginal Languages Trust is to "provide a focused, coordinated and sustained effort in relation to Aboriginal language activities at local, regional and State levels". The Trust will operate as a not-for-profit New South Wales government agency. The Trust will be involved in the preparation of a strategic plan to work with Aboriginal communities to help preserve and reawaken languages in New South Wales.

See also
 Australian Aboriginal languages

References

New South Wales legislation
20th century in New South Wales